Unriddle 2 (simplified Chinese: 最火搭档 2) is a Singaporean Chinese police crime drama which was telecast on Singapore's free-to-air channel, Mediacorp Channel 8. It stars Rui En, Chen Liping, Rebecca Lim, Tay Ping Hui & Elvin Ng as the casts for the second series. This drama serial consists of 20 episodes, and was screened on every weekday night at 9:00 pm. It is a sequel to Unriddle, one of the first sequels in Mediacorp dramas in nearly 10 years. The sequel is also noted for its much darker tone as compared to the first series.

Cast

Trivia
Brandon Wong, Chen Tianwen, and Wang Yuqing returned for season 2 but played roles which are different and unrelated to their respective roles in season 1.
In both seasons, Xiaoman's close friends turned out to be the mastermind of the season. In season 1, the mastermind was Yan Dewei, also known as Chai Zhiyong, Xiaoman's colleague who she most possibly likes, thus Andie Chen did not appear in this sequel but his gun was featured in episode 1. In this season, the mastermind was Gao Jieyu, Xiaoman's friend.
Elvin Ng and Rui En won the Favourite Onscreen Couple award for the third time at Star Awards, even though their characters were not officially together in the show

References from other productions
 Episode 1 of the series was shown in episode 4 of Poetic Justice, where the cameo who bumped Zhengyi appeared in the episode.
 In Episode 3 (Unriddle) of The Recruit Diaries, Rui En and Chen Liping were accidentally mentioned "repeatedly".
 In episode 4 of World at Your Feet, the series was addressed (as "best of buddy") and seen on a magazine when Lan Yangyang (Dennis Chew), who is applying for the supervisor of a food storage company, borrowed it from an interviewee to cover his buttocks (because of a deliberate spill on his pants).

Accolades

References

Singapore Chinese dramas
2012 Singaporean television series debuts
Channel 8 (Singapore) original programming